Valenza is a comune in Italy.

Valenza may also refer to:

Tasia Valenza (born 1967), American actress and voice actress
Tor Alexander Valenza, screenwriter
Pecetto di Valenza, commune in Piedmont, Italy